Bernhard Lichtenberg (3 December 1875 – 5 November 1943) was a German Catholic priest who became known for repeatedly speaking out, after the rise of Adolf Hitler and during the Holocaust, against the persecution and deportation of the Jews. After serving a jail sentence, he died in the custody of the Gestapo on his way to Dachau concentration camp. Raul Hilberg wrote: "Thus a solitary figure had made his singular gesture. In the buzz of rumormongers and sensation seekers, Bernhard Lichtenberg fought almost alone."

He was beatified by the Catholic Church in 1996 and recognized as Righteous among the Nations by Yad Vashem in 2004.

Early life and education
Lichtenberg was born in Ohlau (now Oława), Prussian Silesia, near Breslau (now Wrocław), the second of five children. He studied theology in Innsbruck, Austria-Hungary. He also studied in Breslau and was ordained in 1899.

Ministry

Appointments
Lichtenberg began his ministry in Berlin in 1900, as the pastor of Charlottenburg. He served as a military chaplain during World War I. During the period of 1913-1930 he was a minister at the cathedral Herz-Jesu-Gemeinde (Sacred Heart) in Charlottenburg, Berlin. In 1932, the Bishop of Berlin appointed him as a canon of the Cathedral chapter of St. Hedwig.

Activism
Lichtenberg's encouragement of Catholics to view a screening of the film version of Erich Maria Remarques' anti-war novel All Quiet on the Western Front prompted a vicious attack by Joseph Goebbels' paper Der Angriff. In 1933 the Secret State Police of Germany (Gestapo) had searched his house for the first time.

Active in the Centre Party, in 1935 he went to Hermann Göring to protest against the cruelties of the Esterwegen concentration camp.

Named provost of the cathedral, in 1938, Lichtenberg was put in charge of the Relief Office of the Berlin episcopate, which assisted many Catholics of Jewish descent in emigrating from the Third Reich. After Kristallnacht, the first organized Nazi pogrom in Germany, Lichtenberg warned at the Berlin Church of Saint Hedwig: "The synagogue outside is burning, and that is also a house of God!"  Until his arrest in October 1941, Lichtenberg would pray publicly for the persecuted Jews at the daily Vespers service. Bishop Konrad von Preysing later entrusted him with the task of helping the Jewish community of the city.

He protested in person to Nazi officials against the arrest and killing of the sick and mentally ill, as well as the persecution of the Jews. At first, the Nazis dismissed the priest as a nuisance. Father Lichtenberg was warned that he was in danger of being arrested for his activities, but he continued nonetheless.

In 1941, Lichtenberg protested against the involuntary euthanasia programme by way of a letter to the chief physician of the Reich, Minister of Public Health Leonardo Conti (1900-1945): I, as a human being, a Christian, a priest, and a German, demand of you, Chief Physician of the Reich, that you answer for the crimes that have been perpetrated at your bidding, and with your consent, and which will call forth the vengeance of the Lord on the heads of the German people.

The euthanasia in the health institutions of Nazi Germany was purportedly stopped soon after the church protests against euthanasia headed by the bishops Clemens August Graf von Galen and Theophil Wurm. "Nazi leaders faced the prospect of either having to imprison prominent, highly admired clergymen and other protesters – a course with consequences in terms of adverse public reaction they greatly feared – or else end the programme".

Arrest and imprisonment

Lichtenberg was arrested on 23 October 1941 and sentenced to two years in prison for violation of the Pulpit Law and the Treachery Act of 1934. He asked to accompany Jews to the East in order to provide comfort there. Because he was considered incorrigible, he was picked up in 1943 by the Gestapo to be taken to the Dachau concentration camp. He fell ill and died of pneumonia in hospital in Hof, Bavaria.

Remembrance
On 23 June 1996, Pope John Paul II declared Lichtenberg and Karl Leisner blessed martyrs. The beatification ceremony took place during a Mass celebrated in the Olympic stadium in Berlin. The date of his death, November 5 was designated as the liturgical memorial day of Bernard Lichtenberg by Pope John Paul II.

Lichtenberg's tomb is situated in the crypt of St. Hedwig's Cathedral in Berlin. After the war, the building with the office of the archbishop of Berlin was named Bernhard Lichtenberg house. In the memorial area of the former concentration camp Esterwegen a memorial plaque was installed to honor Lichtenberg for his activities for the prisoners of the camp.

In the historic center of the town of Hof, the area in front of St. Mary's church has since 2013 been named Bernhard-Lichtenberg-Platz and on the initiative of pastor Hans-Jürgen Wiedow a new parish center named after Bernhard Lichtenberg was constructed in 2016/17 under the St. Konrad's church in the town.

On 7 July 2004, Yad Vashem recognized Bernhard Lichtenberg as a Righteous Among the Nations.

Compositions 
 Motet: Psalm 59. Mit zwei Meditationen von Bernhard Lichtenberg. For soprano solo, choir, organ and instruments, from Helge Jung, Berlin 1988. (Prolog: Die grüne Saat, Psalm: Errette mich, mein Gott, beschütze mich, Epilog I: Gott ist die Liebe, Epilog II: Wer mich vor den Menschen bekennt). First performance: Choir of the St. Hedwig's Cathedral Berlin, direktor: Michael Witt.
 Song: Dein Volk die dunklen Zeiten. Text and music: Florian Wilkes, Berlin 1995.
 Song: Lasst uns den sel'gen Bernhard loben. Words: Josef Steiner, Berlin 1996. Melody: Gotteslob, no. 262, tune according to Loys Bourgeois 1551. In: Diözesananhang zum Gotteslob des Erzbistums Berlin.
 Cantata: Wer glaubt kann widerstehn. For Spiker, vocal-solo, choir (SATB) and instruments from Ludger Stühlmeyer, Hof 1999. First performance: 31. Oktober 1999, ZDF, conzertchoir of the Hofer Symphoniker, director: Gottfried Hoffmann.
 Song: Gepriesen bist du, herrlicher Gott, für Bernhard, den seligen Priester. Word: Alois Albrecht, Bamberg 2012, melody: Ludger Stühlmeyer, Hof 2012.
 Vespers: Ludger Stühlmeyer, Gerechter unter den Völkern. Vesper zu Ehren des seligen Bernhard Lichtenberg. Mit einer Biografie und Zitaten. Geleitwort von Nuntius Eterovic. Verlag Sankt Michaelsbund, München 2017, .

See also
 Catholic resistance to Nazi Germany
 Rescue of Jews by Catholics during the Holocaust

References

Further reading
 Brenda Gaydosh, Bernhard Lichtenberg. Roman Catholic Priest and Martyr of the Nazi Regime, Lanham 2017.
 Barbara Stühlmeyer, Ludger Stühlmeyer, Bernhard Lichtenberg. Ich werde meinem Gewissen folgen. Topos plus Verlagsgemeinschaft Kevelaer 2013, .
 Kevin P. Spicer, Resisting the Third Reich: The Catholic Clergy in Hitler's Berlin, (DeKalb: Northern Illinois University Press, 2004). See chapter 7, "The Unique Path of Bernhard Lichtenberg."
 Gotthard Klein, Seliger Bernhard Lichtenberg, Regensburg 1997.
 Erich Kock, Er widerstand. Bernhard Lichtenberg. Dompropst bei St. Hedwig, Berlin, Berlin 1996.
 Martin Persch, "Lichtenberg, Bernhard". In: Biographisch-Bibliographisches Kirchenlexikon (BBKL). Band 5, Bautz, Herzberg 1993, Sp. 20–23.
 H. G. Mann, Prozess Bernhard Lichtenberg. Ein Leben in Dokumenten, Berlin 1977. 
 Otto Ogiermann, Bis zum letzten Atemzug ― Der Prozess gegen Bernhard Lichtenberg, Dompropst an St. Hedwig in Berlin, Leipzig 1968, 4. ed. 1983.
 Alfons Erb, Bernhard Lichtenberg. Dompropst von St. Hedwig zu Berlin,'' Berlin 1946, 5. ed. 1968.

External links
 Bernhard Lichtenberg – A Biographical Outline by Gotthard Klein – Berlin Diocesan Archives, at Archdiocese of Berlin website
 Bernhard Lichtenberg – description of his activity at the Holocaust, at Yad Vashem website
 Online Chapel Bernhard Lichtenberg

1875 births
1943 deaths
People from the Province of Silesia
People from Oława
Centre Party (Germany) politicians
German civilians killed in World War II
Roman Catholics in the German Resistance
Martyred Roman Catholic priests
Burials at St. Hedwig's Cathedral
20th-century venerated Christians
German beatified people
Beatifications by Pope John Paul II
Catholic Righteous Among the Nations
German Righteous Among the Nations
Catholic saints and blesseds of the Nazi era
20th-century German Roman Catholic priests